Structural engineer may refer to:

Structural engineer, an engineering occupation
The Structural Engineer (journal), an academic journal for structural engineers. The content is mainly about structural engineering and geotechnical engineering.